On December 11, 2015, Taliban militants detonated a car bomb and stormed a guesthouse near the Spanish embassy in the Shirpour district of Kabul, Afghanistanhome to many foreign embassies and high-ranking government officials.  Nine people died in the attack, including four Afghans, two Spanish military policemen and three Taliban fighters. Security forces, including Norwegian special forces, took more than ten hours to bring the area back under control.

The Taliban claimed responsibility for the attack.

In October 2016, a member of the Norwegian Marinejegerkommandoen was awarded a medal for saving lives of Spanish diplomats during the incident. The soldier was shot three times during the incident.  The medal was handed out at the Spanish embassy in Oslo, Norway by the Spanish ambassador to Norway.

See also
 War in Afghanistan (2001–present)
 List of terrorist incidents, 2015
 List of terrorist attacks in Kabul

References

2015 murders in Afghanistan
Attacks on diplomatic missions in Afghanistan
Kabul
Terrorist incidents in Kabul
Terrorist incidents in Afghanistan in 2015
Taliban attacks
Suicide bombings in Afghanistan
Mass murder in Afghanistan
Mass murder in Kabul
Mass murder in 2015
2017 in Kabul
December 2015 crimes in Asia
December 2015 events in Afghanistan
Afghanistan–Spain relations
Building bombings in Afghanistan
Attacks in Afghanistan in 2015